Murugaboopathy (born 29 April 1971) is a Ustad Bismillah Khan Yuva Puraskar award winning playwright from the Tamil Nadu state of India. The award was presented to him in 2011 by Sangeet Natak Akademi.

Personal life
Murugaboopathy's elder brothers are the Tamil short-story writers Tamilselvan and Konangi a postmodern Tamil writer. He grew up in Naagalapuram and Nenmeni Mettupatti and he currently lives in Kovilpatti, Tamil Nadu. His maternal grandfather ‘Madurakavi' Baskaradoss was a popular playwright, his father M.S. Shanmugam is a novelist, short-story writer and poet.

He did his masters in theatre-arts from Pondicherry University.

Career
Murugaboopathy started his acting career in theatre from his brother's street theatre group Shristi. He acted in the street play "Safdar Hashmi Nataka Kuzhu" that paid tribute to the theatre activist Safdar Hashmi and took the play to more than 150 villages.

Later his first play in 1993 as writer was Marana Veetin Kurippukal, which was based on the Fyodor Dostoyevsky's Notes From a Dead House. His next 1994 play Sarithirathin Atheetha Museum was about the crimes in third world countries.

His 2013 play Soorpanangu was based on the atrocities and plight of women. The play was released in the backdrop of the 2012 Delhi gang rape incident.

Works
 1993 - Marana Veetin Kurippukal
 1994 - Sarithirathin Atheetha Museum
 2000 - Vanathathi
 2000 - Koondhal Nagaram
 2002 - Uthira Mugamoodi
 2006 - Chemmoothai
 2009 - Kutram Patriya Udal
 2010 - Mirugavidhushagam
 2011 - Soorpanangu
 2013 - Kuhaimaravasigal
 2015 - Mayakkomalikalin Jalakkannadi
 2016 - Neer Nadodikal

References

External links
 Mirugavidhushagam : Contemporary theme and haunting idioms

Living people
Tamil dramatists and playwrights
People from Virudhunagar district
1971 births
Indian male dramatists and playwrights
Dramatists and playwrights from Tamil Nadu
Pondicherry University alumni